Kevin Ernest Weldon  (born 1933) is an Australian book publisher, businessman, philanthropist and supporter of the lifesaving movement. He is best known for book publishing, firstly for the Paul Hamlyn Group, and later for his own publishing company.

He is a founder of Earthwatch Australia and Hanna-Barbera Pty, Ltd., an Australian division of Hanna-Barbera in 1972.

He has served on a variety of committees and boards, including Powerhouse Museum (Sydney) and the Institute of Aboriginal Studies (Canberra).

He is the founding president of the World Lifesaving and International Life Saving Federation, a member of the President's Board of National Council of Surf Lifesaving Association of Australia.

In 1994, he became a member of the Order of Australia for his philanthropy, contribution to water safety as president of World Life Saving, and service to the publishing industry.

Early life 
Weldon was born in 1933 in the small town of Ingham, Queensland, the youngest of five children. His father, Vivian, was the local Ford dealer. At the outbreak of World War II, the family relocated to Brisbane

At age 15, he joined the Pacific Surf Club as a Cadet, which would cement his interest in the surf lifesaving movement.
 
Weldon studied at the Brisbane Grammar School but in 1949, when his mother died suddenly, he left school early. He later enrolled in college two nights a week, where he learned his first trade of color etching.

Career

Early career (1953–1962) 
Weldon began his career at Brisbane's Truth newspaper as a half-tone colour etcher in the process engraving department. Shortly thereafter, Weldon joined the Royal Australian Naval Reserve, becoming a lieutenant in 1956. During this period he also became acquainted with Tony Pixley.

By 1957, at the age of 24, Weldon had set up a new branch of Grenville Publishing in Queensland and employed a staff of eight. Two years later he was appointed general manager of sales and moved to Sydney. In 1963 he published his first book, Cake Decorating and Icing by Beryl Gertner.

Paul Hamlyn Group Australia (1964–79) 
In 1964, Weldon became the founding managing director of the Paul Hamlyn Group in Australia.

Weldon also launched Music for Pleasure, through which he played a part in introducing music into supermarkets, namely Woolworths and Coles.

In 1971, he became president of the World Life Saving Movement.

The following year, he established Australia's first large-scale animation studio, a joint venture with Hanna-Barbera – the creators of such hits as Yogi Bear and the Flintstones. The venture, known as Hanna-Barbera Australia, evolved into Neil Balnaves' Southern Star Group. Paul Hamlyn acquired Australian publishers Lansdowne Press (Melbourne), Ure Smith (Sydney), and Jacaranda (Brisbane). He continued to build a bestselling list in Australia and developed local publishing lists in New Zealand and the Philippines. He also expanded the Heritage partworks to include the Wildlife series both nationally and internationally, and developed a prestigious limited edition list.

Weldon as Australian publisher (1980–89) 
In 1980, Weldon founded Kevin Weldon & Associates. He garnered success with A Day in the Life of Australia, with subsequent volumes being produced in India, China, Africa, the Soviet Union and the United States. The next few years saw him enter the local US market with joint ventures, notably in Texas, as well as guiding the takeover of British publisher Marshall Cavendish by Straits Times, Singapore. 

In 1984, Weldon founded Weldon Owen Publishing with John Owen. The first US office was set up in Seattle, Washington in 1988 and subsequently moved to San Francisco a year later.

He also entered into a joint venture with major newspaper groups John Fairfax Ltd (Sydney) and David Syme Ltd (Melbourne) for major bicentennial work, Australians: a historical library. In 1985, he purchased 50 per cent of the Paul Hamlyn Group (Australia) with James Hardie Industries Ltd and the balance three years later. He changed the company name to Weldon International. Retail sales had increased by about $10 million a year and Weldon continued to diversify, taking an interest in films; he developed complementary book products including Wall of Iron and Over China.

Weldon as international publisher (1990–2000s) 
Kevin Weldon next initiated a policy of devolution in which Weldon International was recast into relatively small, creative publishing and marketing units, which operated independently reporting to a small executive center. No territorial limits were imposed on any of the companies, encouraging export.  Thus, he catalyzed an offshore drive that resulted in Weldon International exports accounting for 55 per cent of Australia's total export of book products.

The group's policy of devolution delivered growth, particularly in offshore activity. Weldon International rose to 183rd of Australia's top 500 exporters.  Publishing companies of Weldon International were now firmly established in the US and UK and the Weldon policy of devolution continued as spin-off publishing activity warranted. Local and US educational publishing for elementary schools became so successful that it was reorganized for marketing overseas through jointly-owned marketing companies in U.S. and UK. Mimosa also became active in Canada, New Zealand, Southeast Asia, and South Africa, producing national commemorative books for governments in Singapore, China, the US, and Indonesia.

Recent publishing ventures 
In 2010, Weldon returned to Australian publishing to launch the 30th-anniversary edition of the 'Macquarie Encyclopaedic Dictionary' and the re-launch of the Australian classic, 'What Bird is That' by Neville Cayley.

In 2012, Weldon launched 'The New Long March' a historic co-publishing project between China's Qingdao Publishing Group and Weldon International. The book, celebrating the 75th Anniversary of the Long March, was launched at the London Book Fair and included the first Augmented Reality feature to be printed in a book. Activated through an app that triggered extra content.

The Ripper Group 
In 2015, Weldon established The Ripper Group, a new organization using remotely piloted aircraft systems, technology and education in the area of search and rescue.

Community service and philanthropy 
In the 1980s, he was a founder of Earthwatch Australia, a voluntary organisation supporting scientific research expeditions. He also established Gwinganna in the Gold Coast hinterland for Indigenous study groups.

He has served on a variety of committees and boards, including Powerhouse Museum (Sydney) and the Institute of Aboriginal Studies (Canberra).

Life saving support 
Weldon attributes much of his success to his activities in the lifesaving movement. He joined the Pacific Surf Club as a fifteen-year-old cadet during 1948–49, and within a year attained the position of social organiser. He rose rapidly through the ranks, holding the posts of vice-captain, captain, chief instructor, and ultimately president. Throughout this period Pacific flourished, becoming one of the most reputable clubs in the state. Moreover, the club accrued large parcels of surrounding land through Weldon's drive and initiative, borrowing money from the bank, and then organizing the sale of chooks through hotels to pay off the debt. Still a trustee of the club and living in Sydney, Weldon has continued guiding the club and promoting its commercial viability.

In 1970, having been the Queensland delegate to the National Council of Surf Lifesaving, Weldon was approached to form an international lifesaving group. Though honoured, Weldon only accepted on the proviso that it would be truly international, with the headquarters moved around the world. Because of this, a great number of innovations were brought to Australia's beaches. The 'rubber ducky' inflatable rescue boats, torpedo rescue tubes and the use of helicopters in surf rescue were all ideas that came from other countries. Ideas were shared through what became known as World Lifesaving.

Kevin Weldon was a member of the President's Board of National Council of Surf Lifesaving Association of Australia. 

In the 1990s, he became the founding President of the newly formed International Lifesaving Federation, which amalgamated the world's three largest water-safety organizations: World Lifesaving, with both professional lifeguard associations and pool lifesavers. The International Life Saving Federation is now the second-largest voluntary organization in the world after the Red Cross. Throughout the years he has helped to raise millions of dollars for lifesaving in Australia and around the world. The Federation includes over sixty member countries and over 25 million members.

Personal life 
In 1994, Weldon became a member of the Order of Australia for his philanthropy, contribution to water safety as president of World Life Saving, and service to the publishing industry.

He is married with three children.

Bibliography

External links 
 National Library of Australia - Interview Kevin Weldon

1933 births
Australian publishers (people)
Living people
Members of the Order of Australia